Michał Słoma (born 31 January 1982 in Prostki, Warmian-Masurian) is a Polish rower. He won a silver medal, as a member of Polish rowing team, in the men's quadruple sculls (5:55.09) at the 2009 European Rowing Championships in Brest, Belarus, and later represented Poland at his first Olympics in London. Sloma also trained for AZS UMK Energa in Toruń under his personal coaches Alex Wojciechowski, Jaroslaw Janowski, Mariusz Szumanski, and Witold Sroga.

Sloma qualified for the men's single sculls at the 2012 Summer Olympics in London by earning a third spot from FISA Olympic Qualification Regatta in Lucerne, Switzerland with an entry time of 7:04.51. Rowing in the C-Final, Sloma paddled his pace to overhaul Monaco's Mathias Raymond for a fifth-place effort and seventeenth overall in 7:34.98. Earlier in the prelims, Sloma posted a lifetime best of 6:54.58 in heat four to secure his automatic slot for the subsequent stages.

References

External links

NBC Olympics Profile

1982 births
Living people
Polish male rowers
Rowers at the 2012 Summer Olympics
Olympic rowers of Poland
People from Ełk County
Sportspeople from Warmian-Masurian Voivodeship
European Rowing Championships medalists